Chrysostomos Revythopoulos (born 19 December 1995) is a Greek professional footballer who plays as a right-back.

Honours
Iraklis
 Gamma Ethniki: 2017–18

References

1995 births
Living people
Greek footballers
Super League Greece 2 players
Football League (Greece) players
Gamma Ethniki players
Kavala F.C. players
Doxa Drama F.C. players
Iraklis Thessaloniki F.C. players
Platanias F.C. players
Association football defenders
Footballers from Drama, Greece